William Byers is a fictional character from the American science fiction horror drama television series Stranger Things. Portrayed by Noah Schnapp, the character appeared in a recurring capacity in the first season before being promoted to the main cast in the second season.

Characterization
Noah Schnapp was cast as Will Byers in August 2015. Schnapp was promoted to series regular for the second season in October 2016. Schnapp was revealed to be returning for the third season in a main role by February 9, 2018. The idea of having Will communicate with Joyce via lightbulbs was inspired by 1980s films, including Poltergeist. In terms of the narrative in the third season, Levy said the season would be less about Will, saying, "We're not going to put Will through hell for a third season in a row. He'll be dealing with stuff, but he won't be at rock bottom... We're [going to be] dealing with forces of evil that are new."

Fictional biography

Season 1

Will, the younger brother of Jonathan Byers and the son of Joyce Byers and Lonnie Byers, is a shy, kind, and often timid boy. In the group's Dungeons and Dragons party, Will is the cleric, but later occasionally plays the role of Dungeon Master; he is referred to as "Will the Wise". In November 1983, he vanishes somewhere near "Mirkwood" after encountering a monster that escaped through a rift to the "Upside Down", an alternate dimension discovered by the Hawkins Laboratory scientists. Will begins communicating with Joyce through lightbulbs, so Joyce arranges a setup so Will can "talk" through the lights next to letters to create sentences. When Jim Hopper and Joyce venture into the Upside Down and find him unconscious, they revive him with CPR and bring him back to the real world, but he still has side effects from his time in the alternate dimension, including a slug emerging from his mouth and visions of the Upside Down.

Season 2

Will is harassed by local residents, who dub him "Zombie Boy" after apparently returning from the dead (due to a hoax orchestrated by the people from Hawkins Laboratory). He has regular appointments with Dr. Sam Owens, who is examining any potential links Will may still have with the "Upside Down"; Will has regular visions of the Upside Down and a looming monster watching him. After one of these visions, he confides in Mike, who in turn reveals he is attempting to contact Eleven. Dustin shows the group a slug-like animal he found and named D'Artagnan, and Will realizes he heard it during one of his visions. Joyce's boyfriend Bob tells Will to "face his fears", not knowing what these fears actually are. When Will attempts to confront the monster, he is possessed by the Mind Flayer from the Upside Down. Will is found and woken up, but he acts strangely: scribbling the underground tunnels of Hawkins endlessly on paper after paper and demanding the house be kept cold. The next day he has a vision of Hopper trapped in the tunnels and Bob discovers what Will's drawings mean. Hopper is saved by the group, but scientists from Hawkins Lab set the tunnels on fire, causing Will to collapse and convulse in agony. Will has memory loss from the experience, and Dr. Owens refuses to destroy the tunnel as it would kill Will. Will instructs the scientists to head to a specific spot he cannot see, but it is revealed that the Mind Flayer is controlling him and has led everyone into a trap. Will is sedated to halt the Mind Flayer and rescued from the lab. He is able to communicate with the group through Morse code. Eventually he is freed from the Mind Flayer through the efforts of his mother, brother, and Nancy Wheeler, who burn the Mind Flayer out of him, a deduction they surmised after comments Will made about wanting to stay cold. He then goes to the Snow Ball while the Mind Flayer still watches him and his friends.

Season 3

Will discovers he still has a link to the Upside Down and privately senses the Mind Flayer's presence. He grows upset with his friends for being in relationships and abandoning their childhood hobbies, such as D&D. He has a fight with Lucas and Mike when they make fun of him trying to play D&D. He and Mike argue, with Mike exclaiming, "It's not my fault you don't like girls!" Will is visibly hurt. Will looks at pictures of his friends dressed as Ghostbusters before destroying "Castle Byers". Will senses a possessed Billy and Heather attack the latter's parents and he realizes that the Mind Flayer is still alive. Will reveals his connection, and the group theorize that Billy is possessed and trap him in a sauna to discover the truth. Billy escapes and attacks them before fleeing when Eleven nearly subdues him. They later save Steve, Robin, and Dustin at Starcourt Mall. The Mind Flayer attacks and is later defeated by the group. At the end of the season, Will moves out of Hawkins with his mother, brother and Eleven after giving away his Dungeons and Dragons set to Erica Sinclair.

Season 4

Will now lives in Lenora, California with Joyce, Jonathan, and Eleven, who is bullied by other students at their school. Mike comes to visit Eleven for spring break; Eleven claims she is living happily, but Will confronts her over her dishonesty. Will and Mike witness Eleven assaulting Angela–her primary bully–after which Will confides Eleven's despair to Mike. Eleven is arrested but soon intercepted by Dr. Owens, who takes her to a research facility in Nevada to participate in a project called "NINA" that is aimed at restoring her powers. Will joins Mike, Jonathan, and Argyle (Jonathan's friend) in a search for Eleven, while evading the pursuit of the U.S. Army. Dustin's girlfriend Suzie helps them find the NINA project's coordinates. Before they reach Eleven, Will shows Mike his painting depicting him and his friends fighting a dragon together; Will claims the painting was Eleven's idea, but then silently breaks into tears, indicating his romantic love for Mike. Eleven overpowers the Army forces as her friends arrive to rescue her.  Jonathan, who senses that there is something unspoken that Will is going through, later assures Will that he is loved and promises to be there for him. Will, Mike, Jonathan, and Argyle help Eleven telepathically fight Vecna through an isolation tank. Upon returning to Hawkins, Will feels the Upside Down's presence return right as the dimension begins to infiltrate Hawkins.

Reception

Critical reception
Will was ranked the third best Stranger Things character by Screen Rant, behind only Eleven and Steve Harrington.

Accolades
Schnapp received a total of two awards and six nominations for his role as Will Byers. Schnapp was nominated for an MTV Movie & TV Awards in the category of Best On-Screen Team with other cast members Gaten Matarazzo, Finn Wolfhard, Caleb McLaughlin, and Sadie Sink in 2018, as well as in the category of Most Frightened Performance the same year, which he won. Along with the rest of the main cast in the second season, Schnapp was awarded the Screen Actors Guild Awards in the category of Outstanding Performance by an Ensemble in a Drama Series in 2017. For the third season, the main cast (including Schnapp) was once again nominated for the same award, however this time the cast did not win. In 2017, Schnapp was nominated for the category of Best Performance in a Digital TV Series or Film – Young Actor.

Sexuality
Viewers had speculated that Will is gay and harbors feelings for his best friend Mike, which the series itself had not confirmed or denied. Critics interpreted the final two episodes of the fourth season as subtextually acknowledging Will's sexuality, particularly during a scene where Will shows Mike his painting of him and his friends, claiming it to be a gift from Eleven, only to silently cry afterwards. The Duffer brothers have commented in a July 2022 interview that this scene, alongside others in the fourth season between Will and Mike, have served as a way of "relieving himself of some of that burden" of discussing his sexuality and that they plan on continuing this character arc as a crucial component of the final season. Schnapp himself stated in July 2022 that he believes that it is "100% clear" and a "very real, obvious thing" that Will is gay and is in love with Mike. Upon Schnapp himself coming out as gay on January 5, 2023, he stated “I guess I’m more similar to Will than I thought!”.

References

American male characters in television
Child characters in television
Fictional characters from Indiana
Fictional LGBT characters in television
Fictional middle school students
Horror television characters
Science fiction television characters
Stranger Things characters
Television characters introduced in 2016
Fictional gay males